The Horror is an EP by RJD2. It was released on Definitive Jux on February 11, 2003.

The EP peaked at number 45 on the Billboard Heatseekers Albums chart, as well as number 32 on the Independent Albums chart.

Critical reception

Scott Hreha of Pitchfork praised The Horror as "a solid reiteration of Rj's remarkable talent." Sara Jayne Crow of XLR8R described the EP as "superlatively inhuman in its quality, much like RJD2's production skills". Nathan Rabin of The A.V. Club said: "Ten tracks of decaying beauty and dirty elegance, The Horror reaffirms RJD2's standing as one of the most gifted and original producers in underground hip-hop." PopMatters critic Dave Hamilton highlighted the instrumental tracks, which he felt "perfectly capture why Deadringer ended up on so many 'best of 2002' lists".

Track listing

The second disc CD-ROM includes the following:
 "Exclusive Live Footage: At Beta Lounge SF and Bowery Ballroom NYC (with El-P, Murs, and Aesop Rock)"
 "The Horror: Animated"
 "Sneak Peak: The Making of 'The Horror' Music Video"
 "Interactive Photo Gallery"

Personnel
Credits adapted from liner notes.

 RJD2 – production
 Ernie Stackmore – mixing
 Nasa – mixing
 Emily Lazar – mastering
 Sarah Register – mastering assistance
 Amaechi Uzoigwe – executive production
 Ese – project coordination
 B. Smith – design, layout
 Cory Piehowicz – photography

Charts

References

External links
 

2003 EPs
RJD2 albums
Definitive Jux EPs